Bistcho Airport  is located adjacent to Bistcho, Alberta, Canada.

References

Registered aerodromes in Alberta
Mackenzie County